The 2006 Utah Blaze season was the first season for the franchise. They finished 7–9 record and qualified for the playoffs, although they lost 57–34 against Arizona to lose their first franchise playoff game.

Roster

Roster at beginning of season
(As of 2006-03-12)

Schedule

Coaching
Danny White entered his first season as the head coach of the Blaze.

Stats

Offense

Quarterback

Running backs

Wide receivers

Touchdowns

Defense

External links

Utah Blaze
Utah Blaze seasons
Utah